Uffington Castle is an early Iron Age (with underlying Bronze Age) univallate hillfort in Oxfordshire, England.  It covers about 32,000 square metres and is surrounded by two earth banks separated by a ditch with an entrance in the western end. A second entrance in the eastern end was apparently blocked up a few centuries after it was built.
The original defensive ditch was V-shaped with a small box rampart in front and a larger one behind it. Timber posts stood on the ramparts. Later the ditch was deepened and the extra material dumped on top of the ramparts to increase their size. A parapet wall of sarsen stones lined the top of the innermost rampart. It is very close to the Uffington White Horse on White Horse Hill.

Excavations
Excavations have indicated that it was probably built in the 7th or 8th century BC and continued to be occupied throughout the Iron Age. Isolated postholes were found inside the fort but no evidence of buildings. Pottery, loom weights and animal bone finds suggest some form of occupation however. The most activity appears to have been during the Roman period as the artefacts recovered from the upper fills of the ditch attest. The ramparts were remodelled to provide more entrances, and a shrine seems to have been built in the early 4th century AD. Two oblong mounds, one containing 46 Romano-British burials and one containing eight Saxon burials, lie nearby.

The Ridgeway
An ancient track passes by the northern entrance to the hillfort; it is known as The Ridgeway. It links to the Icknield Way at the Goring Gap, and passes close to Avebury before heading south across Salisbury Plain. It also passes very close to a Neolithic chambered long barrow, Waylands Smithy, about a mile to the west.

Protection

The hillfort is a Scheduled Monument, and was included in the Ancient Monuments Protection Act 1882 as one of the first 68 sites in Britain and Ireland to receive legal protection. Along with the Uffington White Horse on the slopes below the ramparts, it is in the care of English Heritage.

References

External links 
Ancient Britain – Uffington Castle
YouTube – Uffington Castle Iron age hillfort

Buildings and structures in Oxfordshire
English Heritage sites in Oxfordshire
Hill forts in Berkshire
Vale of White Horse
Tourist attractions in Oxfordshire
Archaeological sites in Oxfordshire
Scheduled monuments in Oxfordshire
Bronze Age sites in Oxfordshire